Garnell Wayman Wilds (born June 8, 1981) is a former American football defensive back in the National Football League for the Washington Redskins and Carolina Panthers.  He played college football at Virginia Tech.

1981 births
Living people
Players of American football from Tampa, Florida
American football defensive backs
Virginia Tech Hokies football players
Washington Redskins players
Carolina Panthers players